Song of the Caballero is a 1930 pre-Code American Western film directed by Harry Joe Brown and written by Bennett Cohen and Leslie Mason. The film stars Ken Maynard. The film was released on June 29, 1930, by Universal Pictures.

Plot
Maynard appears in the role of a drifter who comes home to revenge harm done to his mother. In the process he encounters 10 villains with swords. Maynard also sings in this film.

Cast 
Ken Maynard as Juan Posing as El Lobo
Doris Hill as Anita
Francis Ford as Don Pedro Madero
Gino Corrado as Don Jose Madero
Evelyn Sherman as Doña Louisa
Josef Swickard as Manuel
Frank Rice as Andrea
William Irving as Bernardo
Joyzelle Joyner as Conchita 
Tarzan as Tarzan

References

External links 
 

1930 films
American Western (genre) films
1930 Western (genre) films
Universal Pictures films
Films directed by Harry Joe Brown
American black-and-white films
1930s English-language films
1930s American films